George Parks (June 16, 1824 – December 6, 1870) was a Union Navy sailor in the American Civil War and a recipient of the U.S. military's highest decoration, the Medal of Honor, for his actions at the Battle of Mobile Bay.

Military service
Born in 1824 in Schenectady County, New York, Parks was still living in that state when he joined the Navy. At the Battle of Mobile Bay on August 5, 1864, he "performed his duties with skill and courage" despite heavy fire. For this action, he was awarded the Medal of Honor four months later, on December 31, 1864.

Medal of Honor citation
Rank and organization: Captain of the Forecastle, U.S. Navy. Accredited to: New York. G.O. No.: 45, 31 December 1864.

Parks's official Medal of Honor citation reads:
On board the U.S.S. Richmond during action against rebel forts and gunboats and with the ram Tennessee in Mobile Bay, 5 August 1864. Despite damage to his ship and the loss of several men on board as enemy fire raked her decks, Parks performed his duties with skill and courage throughout a furious 2-hour battle which resulted in the surrender of the rebel ram Tennessee and in the damaging and destruction of batteries at Fort Morgan.

References

External links 
 

1824 births
1870 deaths
Military personnel from Schenectady, New York
People of New York (state) in the American Civil War
Union Navy sailors
United States Navy Medal of Honor recipients
American Civil War recipients of the Medal of Honor